Statistics of Guam League in the 1998 season.

Overview
Anderson Soccer Club won the championship.

References
RSSSF

Guam Soccer League seasons
Guam
Guam
football